Omar Mussa (born 20 August 2000) is a Belgian professional footballer who plays for English club Dagenham & Redbridge, as a midfielder.

Club career
After playing youth football for KV Mechelen, Mussa signed for English club Walsall in January 2019. He was released by Walsall at the end of the 2018–19 season, having made one Football League appearance for the club.

On 26 October 2020, Mussa joined National League club Dover Athletic, after appearing in pre-season for the Kent side. The following day, Mussa came off the bench in the 75' minute of a 3–2 victory over Eastleigh to make his debut for the club. Following's Dover's decision to not play any more matches in the 2020–21 season, made in late January, and subsequent null and voiding of all results, on 5 May 2021 it was announced that Mussa was out of contract and had left the club.

On 11 August 2021, Mussa joined another National League side, Weymouth, ahead of the 2021–22 season. A first career goal for Mussa came in October 2021 when he scored the only goal in a victory over King's Lynn Town. After the match, Weymouth's manager Brian Stock came out and said that he had not "seen a player with his amount of ability".

On 4 July 2022, Mussa signed for National League side Dagenham & Redbridge for an undisclosed fee.

International career
Mussa was a Belgian under-18 international, making 2 appearances in 2017.

Career statistics

References

2000 births
Living people
Belgian footballers
Association football midfielders
Belgium youth international footballers
Belgian expatriate footballers
K.V. Mechelen players
Walsall F.C. players
Dover Athletic F.C. players
Weymouth F.C. players
Dagenham & Redbridge F.C. players
English Football League players
National League (English football) players
Belgian expatriate sportspeople in England
Expatriate footballers in England